Teinoptila antistatica is a moth of the  family Yponomeutidae. It is found in Guizhou, China, and on Java.

The wingspan is 22–26 mm.

The larvae feed on Euonymus japonicus and Maytenus hookeri. They feed concealed within a few leaves connected with webbing, and they overwinter in this stage.

External links
Taxonomic study of the genus Teinoptila Sauber, 1902 from China (Lepidoptera: Yponomeutidae)

Yponomeutidae